The Women's 200 Breaststroke at the 10th FINA World Swimming Championships (25m) was swum on 19 December 2010 in Dubai, United Arab Emirates. 41 swimmers swam in the preliminary heats, with the top-8 advancing to finals that evening.

Records
At the start of the event, the existing world and championship records were as follows.

The following records were established during the competition:

Results

Heats

Final

References

Breaststroke 200 metre, Women's
World Short Course Swimming Championships
2010 in women's swimming